Fetch! with Ruff Ruffman (sometimes shortened as Fetch!) is an American live-action/animated television series that aired on PBS Kids Go! and is largely targeted towards middle school children. It is a reality-game show that is hosted by an animated anthropomorphic dog named Ruff Ruffman who dispenses challenges to the show's real-life contestants. The series ran for five seasons and 100 episodes from May 29, 2006, to November 4, 2010, on PBS, with 30 contestants in that time. Although a sixth season was planned, with auditions taking place in January 2010, WGBH announced on June 14, 2010, that due to lack of funding, the series would end.  In June 2008, the series received its first Emmy for Best Original Song for its theme.

Synopsis
Fetch! is a reality-based game show where young contestants (ages 10–14) take on various challenges to gain points.  During these challenges, the contestants must complete a variety of tasks assigned to them ahead of time (and on the fly) by Ruff and surrogates, depending on the situation. There is also an educational component, as contestants often must learn something (i.e. Astronomy, Puzzles, Carpentry, Engineering, Food Science, Biology, Chemistry, Physics, Mathematics, etc.) in order to complete the task.

Not all contestants leave the studio each episode to complete tasks. "As determined by the Fetch 3000" (according to Ruff), the contestants who remain behind in the studio participate in the "Half-Time Quiz Show", in which Ruff asks them up to ten questions with the limited time based on the activities of the contestants out on challenges. Out on challenges, contestants will have the potential to earn up to 100 points. The contestants in the studio will have a chance to win a maximum of 50 in the "Half-Time Quiz Show". The show has a Fetch Fairness Guarantee; that every contestant will "compete for the same number of points" through thirteen challenges and six "Half-time Quiz Shows" before the final episode. Additionally, Ruff assigns "Bone-us" points (usually 5 or 10, but sometimes 15 or 20) to the stand-out contestants. On rare occasions, there is the possibility to earn more than 100 points (outside of any bonuses). The record for most points earned in one episode was 125, by Brian, Noah, and Khalil in episode 5, season 1. In Season 4, contestants are able to have 1/2 points (i.e. 515 points). At the end of the season, a final point tally is conducted, with the winner of the tally being declared winner of that season to win the "Grand Prize" and will get a poster and put it on the Fetch Wall of Fame.

Prizes are not always desirable, and sometimes the prize holder winds up with a "booby prize"; for example, in "Good Dancing and Bad Breath", Anna and Brian had to dance a waltz in the studio. During the first season, the contestant had the choice of keeping the prize or giving it to a fellow contestant. During the remaining four seasons, there are two unknown prizes between which the winner chooses.  The chosen prize may be "mailed" to the mailbox in Studio G, although occasionally large prizes are hidden elsewhere on the set. In the seventh episode of Season 2, Rosario gave his prize to Nina. In the 15th episode of season 4, Sterling returned his prize to the mailbox.

Cultural references and guest stars
Fetch! with Ruff Ruffman contains a considerable number of direct cultural references for a PBS Kids show, which makes up a large chunk of the series's comedic style. In the season 2 premiere, when Nina does a rather sloppy job at making chocolate candy, Ruff remarks that it is the "Jackson Pollock candy." In the following episode, Ruff mentions that he likes REO Speedwagon. In Season 3, Episode 13, when Sam and Harsha throw sacks in a pail, Ruff makes a comment saying, "I feel like Shaq in the free throw line", making a reference to Shaquille O' Neal. In season 4, Episode 14, when Talia found a horseshoe crab while working on a shrimp boat, a horrified Ruff exclaimed, "Looks like Darth Vader's face with a billion legs coming out of it!" In Episode 17 of the same season, Talia was starstruck when she discovered that she was holding Roger Federer's tennis racket. In Episode 15 of Season 2, when the scuba instructors arrived at the beach, Ruff claimed that they were "faster than Batman" and that he "hoped [Batman] was watching the show". In Episode 14 of Season 5, when Rubye and Marc learned skydiving signs, Ruff remarked that one of the signs looked like "one of Beyoncé's dance moves." In Season 2, Episode 4, when Rosario voiced Ruff for the first time, Ruff remarked: "Is that Ruff Ruffman or Marge Simpson?" In Season 4, Episode 16, when Ruff called Isaac, who was dressed as an old lady, he accidentally called him Mrs. Doubtfire and then corrects himself and says Mrs. Issacson. In Season 5, Episode 18, when Joe explained to the FETCHers, he told Michelle about the book she read. Michelle said: "I believe that was Green Eggs and Ham."

The show also had some guest stars. In episode 6 of season 1, Aaron Carter and the contestants all appeared in his new music video. In episode 10 of season 1, Anna and Noah must earn some quick cash by building a lemonade stand with the help of master carpenter Norm Abram. In season 2, episode 2, Ruff sends Madi and Willie to meet the Blue Man Group. In episode 4 of season 2, Bridget and Rosario met puppeteer John Kennedy posing as Bernie the Pig. In Season 3, Episode 4, Sam meets Senator Ted Kennedy. In season 5, episode 4, Crush the sea turtle from the movie Finding Nemo makes an appearance via Ruff's Fetch 3000. Andrew Stanton reprises his role as Crush here. In episode 2 of season 4, the host of Design Squad Nathan Ball appeared in a pole vault challenge. In episode 17 of season 4, Gary Sohmers, an appraiser for 13 seasons of Antiques Roadshow, made his appearance challenging two of the contestants to explore Brimfield Antiques and Collectibles Show in Brimfield, Massachusetts.

Episodes

Cast members

Characters

Main

 Ruff Ruffman (voiced by Jim Conroy) is the host and main character of the show.  Ruff does not like cats though his boss, Blossom, is an exception. Ruff thinks that dogs are superior to them in most ways. 
 Blossom, whose full name is Princess Blossom Pepperdoodle Von Yum Yum, is a black cat. Blossom never speaks even though Ruff repeats what she says to help the audience clarify what she isn't saying. At the beginning of Season 2, she was Ruff's intern, but was later promoted to being his boss in Season 3. Ruff did not enjoy Blossom's company at first, but in the later seasons forms a close bond with her. 
 Chet, a brown mouse, is Ruff's intern. First appearing in Season 3's second episode "When Home is a House of Cards", Chet replaces Blossom when she is promoted to supervisor. He also does not speak and does not seem to have any eyes or limbs, resembling a computer mouse. He is capable of doing feats that would normally be considered impossible, such as completing an obstacle course in seconds and building a jet engine that runs solely on expired liver and pineapple biscuit shakes. 
 Henry is Ruff's boss, never seen but occasionally calling Ruff on the "Henry Hotline". Henry provides Ruff with the show's budget and oversees Ruff's spending. 
 Murray is one of Ruff's cousins, who runs the behind-the-scenes technical work and is constantly blamed for minor problems on the show. Unlike the other animated animals, Murray is portrayed by a real basset hound and sometimes appears in the kids' challenges. He stopped appearing at the start of Season 4.
 Tank replaced Murray in Season Four. He is a real bulldog who wears a FETCH! shirt and earmuffs. Though it does not seem like it at first, Tank has proven to be a reliable worker.

Supporting
 Grandma Ruffman (voiced by Jim Conroy) is Ruff and Scruff's grandmother who speaks with a Jewish accent. 
 Scruff Ruffman (voiced by Jim Conroy) is Ruff's identical (but evil) twin brother, distinguished from his brother by a five-o'clock shadow.
 Ruffael Ruffmanowitz (voiced by Jim Conroy) is Ruff's great-great-great-great-great-great grandfather. 
 Great Uncle McRuffmantosh (voiced by Jim Conroy) is Ruff's great-uncle who has a beard and has an exaggerated Scottish accent. 
 Spot Spotnik is Ruff's rival. He is tan with brown spots.
 Charlene is the poodle next door and love interest of both Ruff and Spot. She does not reciprocate any feelings towards either dog.  
 Helga von Ruffman (voiced by Jim Conroy) is Ruff's cousin, a fashion designer from Germany.
 Glen Ruffman  (voiced by Jim Conroy) is Ruff and Scruff's nephew. He wears dental braces and is obsessed with magic and fantasy
 Gerry Geranium (voiced by Jim Conroy) is Grandma Ruffman's pet parrot who Ruff sometimes looks after.  In seasons 4 and 5, he explains to Ruff that his parents are alive and aids him in finding them.
 Blackmuzzle Ruffman (voiced by Jim Conroy) is the most feared canine pirate of the seven seas. He appeared at the end of "Arrgh - All Me Eggs Are Cracked!" for pledging the show with his own loot. He also appeared in "Season Four is Canceled" to attack Ruff's doghouse boat because he was bored and Ruff refused to give him Gerry to replace a frog on his shoulder. He told Ruff that he recently acquired the internet so that he does not have to shout from his ship; in response Ruff told him to visit his website, which he does so, allowing Ruff, Blossom, and Chet to lose him. In a voicemail he tells Ruff to be an oceanographer and help him navigate the sea.
 Roxy Ruffman is Ruff's sister. She is mentioned in "Feeling Sheepish Ruff?" when Ruff looks after her sheep
 Harriet Hackensack (voiced by Jim Conroy) is the new Australian owner of Ruff's network company which she has recently bought at the start of Season 4. She dislikes Murray for stealing her valuable sled Rosebud
 Wink and Dinah Ruffman are Ruff's "long-lost" parents who gave the FETCHers instructions on how to get off Game Show Island. It is revealed in Season 5's finale that they are spies.
 Tom and Trixie (voiced by Jim Conroy) are Ruff's rivals who are the hosts of Go Get It!, a ripoff of FETCH!. They were actually Ruff's parents, who were working undercover.

Production
Fetch! (an acronym for "Fabulously Entertaining TV with a Canine Host") was produced at WGBH Studios in Boston. Seasons were filmed about a year before they aired. Season 4 was the first season to be filmed in High Definition (HD) in 2009.

The challenges were filmed mostly in Boston (as well as other areas in the US state of Massachusetts) and various other parts of the USA, depending on the challenges, during summertime when the children are out of school. The challenges, which were out on the field, are cut documentary-style, very similar to network reality TV shows.

After the FETCHers finished filming the challenges, contestants acted in-studio, with the voice of Ruff. Jim Conroy traveled to Boston from New York for the two weeks they spent shooting in the studio. The fourth camera simply captured Conroy doing his lines as Ruff in the audio booth. The kids heard him in the studio and he heard their reactions in his headphones. Ruff's lines were the only lines that were scripted out, though he would sometimes ad-lib an answer to a question or comment from a FETCHer. Once the lines were recorded, the show went into editing, where the challenges were sorted into the show order.

Then they were sent to Jim Conroy in New York City, to voice the dialog for Ruff's animation. Once that was complete, it was sent back to WGBH where editors placed audio clips of the animated characters. Once all of this was done, the episode was sent to Global Mechanic to animate the show. One out of the four editors had an off-set four-week system in place where one of them was ready to send a cut of a new episode to Vancouver, British Columbia, Canada every Friday. It took about six months to complete one season of the show.

Due to a lack of funding, WGBH announced that Fetch! would be canceled at the end of its fifth season even though casting had been completed for a sixth.

Studio G set
Studio G is the studio for Fetch! with Ruff Ruffman. Three segments of the show take place in the studiothe intro, half-time quiz show, and "Triumph Tally". In season 1, the contestants recognized that Studio G looked like a garage and asked Ruff why. This really annoyed Ruff, who told them it was not a garage but "Studio G". Over the course of the show's five seasons, the studio changed. For season 1 and 2, the studio remained relatively unaltered, but sizable changes were made to the studio for season 3. The television through which the contestants communicate with Ruff was changed to a more current flat-screen TV, and Ruff's owner parked her car, a dusty Volkswagen Karmann Ghia, in the studio. A flamingo and trees as well as a "Studio G" sign and a "wall of fame" displaying past Fetch! contestant season winners were added to the studio in season 2. In season 4, a new remote control mailbox was placed on the TV Screen, which popped out when a challenge was in the mailbox. Season 5's major renovation occurred during the season finaleit became the Go Get It! studio (Studio P), and was a remodeled version of the Studio G set with new carpeting and pink chairs.

Auditions
To audition for the program, potential contestants were required to be between the ages of 10 and 14 by the first day of shooting, and be able to live in the greater Boston area over the summer, during school vacations, and a few weekends during the school year. FETCHers needed to be filmed without missing school. Auditions were handled by Maura Tighe Casting.

Cancellation
The show had auditions for their sixth season in January 2010, but on June 14, 2010, due to lack of funding, WGBH Boston announced that Season 5 will be the final season. On June 27, 2010, Jim Conroy (the voice of Ruff) made the official announcement at the Daytime Emmy Awards ceremony. On his Facebook page, he said, "It's such an impossible task going up against Sesame Street, Cyberchase, and The Electric Company. So you have to consider the nomination as a win. Can't complain. PBS gave us 100 episodes and 5 seasons. Many good shows never saw that kind of time." Fetch! aired its fifth and final season in October 2010, with the final episode date being November 4, 2010. After the series ended, reruns aired on selected PBS stations until August 31, 2014. It aired on the PBS Kids channel from January 16, 2017, to November 20, 2018.

Spinoffs

Ruff Ruffman: Humble Media Genius
Later, in May 2014, a new spin-off was announced, called Ruff Ruffman: Humble Media Genius.  This spin-off debuted in Fall 2014 and features short animations of Ruff Ruffman, focusing on internet safety.

Episodes:
"Texting and You!" (November 2014)
"Photos and You!" (November 2014)
"Searching and You!" (November 2014)
"Technology and You!" (November 2014)
"Technology and You! Bonus Video: Chicken Island" (January 2015)
"Hang Up and Drive!" (July 2015)
"Hang Up and Drive! Bonus Video: Just Drive!" (July 2015)
"Privacy and You!" (January 2016)
"Privacy and You!: Deleted Scene" (January 2016)
"The Internet and Chet" (March 2016)
"Say! Cheese?" (May 2016)
"Getting the Most From the Internet" (June 2016)
"An Orange Dog Goes Green" (January 2017)

The Ruff Ruffman Show

On July 30, 2017, PBS Kids and WGBH announced that Ruff Ruffman along with his two assistants Blossom and Chet will be making a comeback in a new digital series called The Ruff Ruffman Show, where they answer questions from real kids, take on challenges and learns the value of perseverance—all while modeling science inquiry skills. The digital series premiered on September 28, 2017.

Team Hamster!
On December 15, 2020, a web series called Team Hamster! premiered. It is a spin-off focusing on Ruff Ruffman's hamsters - Sadie, Mateo, and Tasha. The series also ties-in with games on the PBS KIDS website.

Cancelled spinoff: Spyhounds
WGBH and Global Mechanic had announced plans to produce a spin-off of Fetch! based on the online game Spyhounds. It would feature Ruff, Blossom, and Chet having a new career as super-spies, and Ruff is in way over his head. Luckily, he has much help: five clever kids, a purple poodle named Trixie, and millions of kids online. The spinoff plans were announced but were later canceled.

Fetchtok
On July 21, 2022, WGBH and Jim Conroy released FetchTok, a TikTok-based challenge where Ruff (voiced again by Conroy) asks viewers to record themselves performing his challenges and posting them on the app.

Reception

Critical response
The show was an instant hit with audiences and received critical acclaim. The New York Times praised the series, writing "The show’s creators have written in all the sarcasm and amazingness of a more sophisticated and harder-edged show, but not in a way that condones such behavior. There’s a kind of genius to the setup." Larisa Wiseman of Common Sense Media gave the series four out of five stars, saying this entertaining PBS series combines the comedy of a cartoon, the challenge of a game show, and the best of reality TV.

Awards and accolades
Fetch! has received numerous awards over the years.

 APEX 2009: Grand Award for The Ruff Guide to Science
 U.S. International Film and Video Festival 2009: "Certificate for Creative Excellence" in the Children's Programming category
 2009 Daytime Emmy Nominations: Outstanding Children's Series, Outstanding Writing in a Children's Series, Outstanding Achievement in Main Title and Graphic Design
 iParenting Media Award 2009: Winner – Television "2009 Best Products"
 Parents' Choice Awards 2009: Silver Honor Winner: TV show
 WorldFest Houston 2009: Gold Remi Award "TV Series – Family/Children"
 WorldFest Houston 2009: Platinum Remi Award "TV Series – Family/Children"
 MITX Award 2008: Winner – Best Kids, 'Tweens and Teens site
 2008 Daytime Emmy Award: Outstanding Original Song – Children's And Animation – Fetch! Theme Song
 2008 Daytime Emmy Nominations: Outstanding Writing in a Children's Series, Outstanding Original Song – Children's And Animation – Fetch! Theme Song, Outstanding Achievement in Single Camera Editing
 U.S. International Film and Video Festival 2008: First Place "Gold Camera Award" in the Children's Programming category
 Clarion Award 2008 Competition: Winner – Television Special Audience Program
 Parents' Choice Awards 2008: Silver Honor Winner: Web site, Recommended Award Winner: TV show
 WorldFest Houston: Gold Remi Award for "TV Series – Family/Children"
 iParenting Media Award 2008: Winner – Television "2008 Best Products"
 PRIX JEUNESSE 2008 Festival: Runner-Up Fourth Place – Ages 7–11 Non-Fiction
 New York Festival International 2008: Bronze World Medal in Youth programs
 2007 Daytime Emmy Nominations: Performer in an Animated Series, Original Song – Fetch! Theme Song
 U.S. International Film and Video Festival 2007: Second Place "Silver Screen Award" in the Children's Programming category
 Clarion Award 2007 Competition: Winner – Television Special Audience Program
 Parents' Choice Awards: 2007 Gold Award Winner
 WorldFest Houston: Bronze Remi Award for "TV Series – Family/Children"

References

External links
 
 Discovery Kids Asia
 

2000s American animated television series
2010s American animated television series
2000s American children's comedy television series
2010s American children's comedy television series
2000s American children's game shows
2010s American children's game shows
2000s American comedy game shows
2010s American comedy game shows
2000s American reality television series
2010s American reality television series
2006 American television series debuts
2010 American television series endings
American children's animated comedy television series
American children's animated game shows
American children's animated education television series
American children's reality television series
American flash animated television series
American television series with live action and animation
Animated television series about children
Animated television series about dogs
English-language television shows
PBS Kids shows
PBS original programming
Television series by WGBH
Television shows set in Boston
Elementary school television series
Middle school television series
Mathematics education television series
Science education television series